Live at the Hope and Anchor is a live album by the Stranglers, released on 9 March 1992 by EMI. It consists of an entire set from a concert at the Hope and Anchor pub in Islington, North London, recorded on 22 November 1977.

Background
This particular concert took place on the opening night of the "Front Row Festival", a series of shows by regulars of the venue during 1977. The album was originally only available as a bootleg recording. The song "Tits" featured on the white EP that was given away free with the first 75,000 copies of the band's Black and White album in 1978. "Hanging Around" and "Straighten Out" were included on the "Front Row Festival" album, released in 1978. "In the Shadows" was previously released on the "Don't Bring Harry" EP in 1979. Many of the songs in the band's set that night were played by request; for this show, they rehearsed their entire catalogue. It is regarded as one of the band's more memorable shows. In 1992 the whole concert received an official release, produced by Stranglers bassist/vocalist Jean Jacques Burnel.

Track listing

Note 
There's a noticeable pitch drop on "Peasant in the Big Shitty" which is quite sudden and after the second verse. It sounds as if either the tape was manually altered during recording of the song live or (more likely), in the studio. It's akin to a power drop affecting the recording. Also the e.q. and sound levels throughout the album are inconsistent. Again it's noticeable more from transitions from some songs. E.g. "In the Shadows" to "Walk On By" have completely different e.q. and balance. Although this can be a bit jarring in places, it adds to the rough hewn (and punky) feel of the album as a whole.

Personnel
Credits adapted from the album's liner notes, except where noted.

The Stranglers
 Hugh Cornwell – guitar, vocals
 Jean-Jacques Burnel – bass, vocals
 Dave Greenfield – keyboards, vocals
 Jet Black – drums 

Technical
 Jean-Jacques Burnel – producer
 Tim Summerhayes – engineer (Rak Records Mobile)
 Assorted Images – sleeve
 Chris Gabrin – photography
 Trevor Rogers – photography
 Nik Yeoman – liner notes

References 

1992 live albums
The Stranglers live albums
EMI Records live albums